Tomer Frankel (born 18 October 2000) is an Israeli swimmer. He competes in the 100 m butterfly, 100 m freestyle, 100 m medley, 200 m butterfly, 200 m freestyle, 400 m freestyle, 50 m butterfly, 4x100 m freestyle, 4x100 m medley, 4x100 m freestyle mixed, 4x200 m freestyle, and 4x50 m freestyle. He is the European junior champion in the 100 m freestyle and the 4x200 m freestyle (2018 Helsinki).

Swimming career
Frankel competes in the 100 m butterfly, 100 m freestyle, 100 m medley, 200 m butterfly, 200 m freestyle, 400 m freestyle, 50 m butterfly, 4x100 m freestyle, 4x100 m medley, 4x100 m freestyle mixed, 4x200 m freestyle, and 4x50 m freestyle. His club is Hapoel Jerusalem.

2016-17; two-time European Junior bronze medalist
In July 2016, he won a bronze medal at the 2016 European Junior Swimming Championships in Hódmezővásárhely, Hungary, in the Men's 4x200 m freestyle.

In June 2017, Frankel won a bronze medal at the 2017 European Junior Swimming Championships in Netanya, Israel, in the Men's 4x200 m freestyle. He competed in the men's 200 m freestyle event at the 2017 World Aquatics Championships the following month.

2018-present; two-time European Junior Champion
In May 2018, at 17 years of age, Frankel won and set Israeli records in the 100 m butterfly (in 52.25; breaking Alon Mandel’s record set in 2009) and the 200 m freestyle (in 1:47.15; breaking Nimrod Shapira Bar-Or's record set in 2008) at the 2018 Israel Cup. In July 2018, Frankel won gold medals in at the 2018 European Junior Swimming Championships in Helsinki, Finland, in both the Men's 100 m freestyle and the Men's 4x200 m freestyle. In December 2018 he won, and set Israeli short course national records, at the 2018 Arena Israeli Swimming Championships in the 400 m freestyle (in 3:42.86), the 200 m freestyle (in 1:43.50), and the 200 m butterfly (in 1:53.72).

In April 2019, at the 2019 Israel Cup he won the men’s 200 m freestyle in a time of 1:48.40. That same month he won a bronze medal in the 100 m butterfly at the Stockholm Open. In June 2019 Frankel set a new Israeli national record in the men’s 100 m butterfly, at 52.16, at the 2019 Sette Colli Trophy in Rome, Italy. 

In December 2019, he met the 2020 Olympic qualifying standard of 51.96 in the men’s 100 m butterfly with splits of 24.29/27.63 in the 2019 Swim Cup Amsterdam.

See also
List of Israeli records in swimming

References

External links
 
 
 Tomer Frankel at SwimCloud.com
 

2000 births
Living people
Israeli male swimmers
Place of birth missing (living people)
Israeli male freestyle swimmers
Male butterfly swimmers
Male medley swimmers
Swimmers at the 2020 Summer Olympics
Olympic swimmers of Israel